Jinshan Temple is a Buddhist temple located on an island of Wulongjiang River, in Cangshan District of Fuzhou, Fujian, China. It is the only Buddhist temple in the river in China and the only Buddhist temple on the water in Fujian.

History

Song dynasty
The original temple dates back to the Shaoxing period (1131–1162) of the Southern Song dynasty (1127–1279).

Ming dynasty
In the Jiajing era (1522–1566) of the Ming dynasty (1368–1644), Zhang Jing lived here

In 1615, in the reign of Wanli Emperor (1573–1620), the bridge, which connected the island and the bank, was destroyed by flood.

Qing dynasty
In 1870, in the Tongzhi period (1862–1874) of the Qing dynasty (1644–1911), Scottish photographer John Thomson visited the temple and took a lot of pictures, which published in his album Foochow and the River Min.

Modern China
The temple was restored in 1934 after damage by a series of floods.

Architecture
The temple consists of five buildings: Hall of Mazu, Hall of Great Compassion, left wing-room and right wing-room, and a Song dynasty stone pagoda.

Hall of Mazu
The Hall of Mazu is the main hall in the temple enshrining statues of Mazu and Guanyin. Under the eaves is a plaque with the Chinese characters "Jinshan Temple" written by former Venerable Master of the Buddhist Association of China Zhao Puchu.

Stone Pagoda

Gallery

References

Buddhist temples in Fuzhou
Buildings and structures in Fuzhou
Tourist attractions in Fuzhou